Samuel Ryder Academy (also known as SRA and formerly Francis Bacon School) is a mixed all-through school located in St Albans in South Hertfordshire, England.

It is an all-through school with primary and secondary departments for children aged 4 to 19. This includes a sixth form provision which offers students A Levels and BTECs as courses for study.

History
It is named after Samuel Ryder, the English businessman, entrepreneur, golf enthusiast, professional dog breeder and golf promoter who spent many years living and working in St Albans.  The school was previously named after Sir Francis Bacon, the Elizabethan polymath (philosopher, statesman, scientist, jurist, orator, and author) who lived at Old Gorhambury House.

House system 
The student body is split into seven houses: Austen (Green), Bronte (Silver), Christie, (Orange), Dahl (Red), Hardy (White), King (Blue) and Wordsworth (Purple), named for Jane Austen, Emily Jane Brontë, Agatha Christie, Roald Dahl, Thomas Hardy, Martin Luther King Jr. and William Wordsworth respectively.

Grounds and facilities
The school has a large field with multiple football and rugby pitches and a cricket pitch, and extensive sports facilities, including a gymnasium, swimming pool and 7 all-weather tennis courts. It also has a full-size 3G astroturf pitch with state of the art changing rooms and a fully kitted sports centre also containing a gym and dance studio. The school has Media and Creative Facilities comprising television and media studios, including kitted studio and location filming and recording equipment. The school also houses well-equipped dance studio drama, DT and art facilities as well as numerous computing suites.

Other
The school is part of the Scholars’ Education Trust which consists of Sir John Lawes School, Samuel Ryder Academy, Robert Barclay Academy, Harpenden Academy and Priory Academy.

References

External links
 Samuel Ryder Academy website

Educational institutions with year of establishment missing
Primary schools in Hertfordshire
Secondary schools in Hertfordshire
Academies in Hertfordshire
Schools in St Albans